Tatiana Vladimirovna Petrova (born 22 May 1973 in Chelyabinsk) is a Russian water polo player who competed in the 2000 Summer Olympics and in the 2004 Summer Olympics.

In 2000, she won the bronze medal with the Russian team. She was the top sprinter at the 2000 Olympics, with 16 sprints won.

Four years later she was part of the Russian team which finished fifth.

See also
 Russia women's Olympic water polo team records and statistics
 List of Olympic medalists in water polo (women)
 List of World Aquatics Championships medalists in water polo

References

External links
 

1973 births
Living people
Russian female water polo players
Olympic water polo players of Russia
Water polo players at the 2000 Summer Olympics
Water polo players at the 2004 Summer Olympics
Olympic bronze medalists for Russia
Olympic medalists in water polo
World Aquatics Championships medalists in water polo
Medalists at the 2000 Summer Olympics
21st-century Russian women